Cotton Belt Railroad Industrial Historic District is located in the eastern part of Grapevine, Texas.

It was added to the National Register on September 4, 1997.

B & D Mills
Kirby Buckner and W. D. Deacon bought the mill in 1933 and changed it into a feed manufacturing complex.

In 1939 an east warehouse was constructed and a concrete grain elevator was completed in 1950. The tower was completed in 1956 which made the facility the first electronic feed manufacturing plant in Texas and also the first business to deliver bulk feed. The mill closed down in 1979. In 1995 a fire damaged many parts of the building and also damaged parts of the tower's panels.

Photo gallery

See also

National Register of Historic Places listings in Tarrant County, Texas

References

External links

National Register of Historic Places in Tarrant County, Texas
Historic districts in Tarrant County, Texas
Grapevine, Texas
Historic districts on the National Register of Historic Places in Texas